Randall is a former town in Helt Township, Vermillion County, in the U.S. state of Indiana.  Randall is also 1.6 miles northwest of another extinct town: Toronto, on W County Road 700 S. The nearest extant community is the town of Dana, to the northeast.

History
The post office at Randall was established in 1858 and discontinued in 1872. The community was named in honor of the Randall family of settlers.

Geography

References

Former populated places in Vermillion County, Indiana
Ghost towns in Indiana